Kaldenkirchen station is the railway station on the Viersen–Venlo railway in the municipality of Kaldenkirchen, itself a town part of Nettetal in the Viersen district in western Germany. Between 1867 and 1999 it was also on the now closed Kempen–Venlo railway

It is situated at the far western end of the Viersen to Venlo line, about three kilometers away from the Dutch border. In former times, it saw some high-profile traffic due to border regulations, but has largely fallen into disuse since the Schengen agreement has become effective. It is still pending renovation.

Train services
Trains of the RE13 line call hourly at the station. There are no other passenger services, though the station sees a good number of through freight services going through to Venlo railway station and further into the Netherlands. The freight yard of the station therefore has fallen into disuse and is pending demolition.

The following services currently call at the station:

Regional services  Venlo - Mönchengladbach - Düsseldorf - Hamm

Notes

Railway stations in North Rhine-Westphalia
Railway stations on the Staatslijn G